Piccadilly Third Stop is a 1960 British thriller film directed by Wolf Rilla and starring Terence Morgan, Yoko Tani and John Crawford. The screenplay concerns a wealthy playboy who hires a gang of criminals to help him steal £100,000.

It was shot at Pinewood Studios and on location around London, including numerous locations around Belgravia. Holborn tube station filled in as the fictional "Belgravia station" on the Piccadilly line. The film's sets were designed by the art director Ernest Archer.

Plot
Crook Dominic Colpoys-Owen (Terence Morgan) has his eye on the loot inside an embassy in London after an ambassador's daughter, Seraphina (Yoko Tani), unwittingly reveals that her father, away on business, has left big money behind in the safe. Colpoys-Owen works his smooth-talking charm on the innocent girl, who becomes so infatuated that she agrees to help his gang with its plan. This involves a robbery from the embassy, which is in Knightsbridge, via the London Underground.

Trivia
Whilst Terence Morgan's character (Dominic) is standing in the Tube-Station eyeing the station staff, he is positioned next to some film posters that are daubed onto the tube station's walls. At least one of those posters next to him is from an actual film that Terence Morgan had starred in earlier in the year (The Shakedown).

Cast
 Terence Morgan as Dominic Colpoys-Owen
 Yoko Tani as Seraphina Yokami
 John Crawford as Joe Pready
 Mai Zetterling as Christine Pready
 William Hartnell as Colonel
 Dennis Price as Edward
 Ann Lynn as Mouse
 Charles Kay as Toddy
 Doug Robinson as Albert
 Gillian Maude as Bride's Mother
 Trevor Reid as Bride's Father
 Ronald Leigh-Hunt as Police Sergeant
 Tony Hawes as Harry Prentice
 Clement Freud as Chemmy dealer
 Judy Huxtable as Angela Vaughan

Critical reception
Allmovie called it a "fast-paced, standard crime story"; while the Radio Times called it a "plodding low-budget thriller".

External links

References

1960 films
1960s crime thriller films
Films directed by Wolf Rilla
Films shot at Pinewood Studios
British crime thriller films
Films set in London
Films shot in London
Films set on the London Underground
1960s English-language films
1960s British films